Komensaurus is a genus of basal aigialosaurid mosasauroid from the Late Cretaceous period. It was found at Komen in Slovenia in limestone dating from the Cenomanian. It was earlier referred to as the "Trieste aigialosaur". In 2007, the type species Komensaurus carrolli was named. Its holotype, specimen MCSNT 11430, was discovered in Slovenia and lived alongside the related Carsosaurus.

See also

 List of mosasaurs

External links
 Oceans of Kansas

Notes

Mosasaurids
Mosasaurs of Europe

zh:莫那龍